Lone Cowboy is a 1933 American Pre-Code Western film directed by Paul Sloane and written by Paul Sloane, Agnes Brand Leahy, Bobby Vernon, and Will James. The film stars Jackie Cooper, Lila Lee, and Addison Richards. The film was released on December 1, 1933, by Paramount Pictures.

Plot

Jackie Cooper plays an orphan who travels by railroad to live on a ranch in Nevada.

Cast 
Jackie Cooper as Scooter O'Neal
Lila Lee as Eleanor Jones
Addison Richards as Dobe Jones
John Wray as Bill O'Neal
Gavin Gordon as Jim Weston
Barton MacLane as J.J. Baxter
J. M. Kerrigan as Mr. Curran
William Le Maire as Buck
George C. Pearce as The Doctor
Charles Middleton as U.S. Marshal

Production

The railroad scenes were filmed on the Sierra Railroad in Tuolumne County, California.

See also 
Shoot Out (1971)

References

External links

1933 films
American Western (genre) films
1933 Western (genre) films
Paramount Pictures films
American black-and-white films
Films based on American novels
Films based on Western (genre) novels
Films directed by Paul Sloane
1930s English-language films
1930s American films